No. 3 Court is a tennis court at the All England Lawn Tennis and Croquet Club, Wimbledon, London. Unlike the other three Grand Slam events, Wimbledon does not name its main courts after famous players, choosing instead to use numbers, with the exception of Centre Court.

History

Original No. 3 Court and renaming
The original No. 3 Court was renamed in 2009 to Court 4. Subsequently, this court and the surrounding area was demolished to make way for both the replacement Court 4 and space for stands of the new No. 3 Court.

New No. 3 Court
Following the building of the new No. 2 Court, the old No. 2 Court was rebuilt, becoming the new No. 3 Court. Work began at the end of the 2009 Championships and was finished in time for the 2011 Championships. The new No. 3 Court has a capacity of 2,000. It is the fourth largest court at Wimbledon after Centre Court, No. 1 Court, and No. 2 Court.

See also
 List of tennis stadiums by capacity

References

External links
 

Tennis venues in London
Wimbledon Championships